The 2018–19 Portland State Vikings women's basketball team represents Portland State University during the 2018–19 NCAA Division I women's basketball season. The Vikings, led by fourth-year head coach Lynn Kennedy, will return to play their home games at Viking Pavilion after a one year renovation and are members of the Big Sky Conference. They finished the season 25–8, 14–6 in Big Sky play to finish in fourth place. As the No. 4 seed in the Big Sky Conference women's tournament, they advanced to the championship game and defeated Eastern Washington, earning their second invitation to the NCAA Division I women's basketball tournament. They lost to Oregon in the first round.

Roster

Schedule

|-
!colspan=9 style=| Exhibition

|-
!colspan=9 style=| Non-conference regular season

|-
!colspan=9 style=| Big Sky regular season

|-
!colspan=9 style=| Big Sky Women's Tournament

|-
!colspan=9 style=| NCAA Women's Tournament

See also
2018–19 Portland State Vikings men's basketball team

References

Portland State
Portland State Vikings women's basketball seasons
Portland State
Portland State Vikings women's basketball
Portland State Vikings women's basketball